Live in Reykjavik may refer to:

Live in Reykjavik (Psychic TV album)
Live in Reykjavik, Iceland album by This Will Destroy You 2013
Live In Reykjavik Mezzoforte (band) (2007)
Austurbaejarbio (Live In Reykjavik 1983) The Fall discography Paul Hanley (musician)